Uḫna was a king of the ancient Anatolian city of Zalpuwa during the 18th century BC, middle chronology, who conquered the Hittite city of Neša. According to the Text of Anitta (KBo 3.22), he brought the statue of the god Siusum, from Neša to Zalpuwa. Several years later king Anitta brought this statue back to Neša.

Notes 

Kings of Zalpuwa
17th-century BC rulers